Craig Andrew Crowley  (born in 1964) is the 8th President of the International Committee of Sports for the Deaf, served between 2009 and 2013.

Crowley previously served as Trustee of Signature (Accredited Body for British Sign Language Levels) and National Register of Communication Professionals working with Deaf/Deafblind People (NRCPD).

Crowley worked as deputy director of Royal National Institute for Deaf People (RNID)Community & Care Support Services and also had a brief stint as executive director of European Union of the Deaf (EUD) in 2005.

Crowley is currently the Chief Executive of one of UK's leading Deaf-led Charity, Action Deafness.

Early life
As a Deaf child of hearing parents, he was brought up in Northumberland. Crowley went on to co-found National Leadership Training Programme for both Deaf and Hearing young people in Sport in the 1980s. From his time with Friends for Young Deaf (FYD) he went to Bulmershe College of Higher Education (now part of Reading University)  He was elected president of the student union. He is the first-ever Deaf President of a Student Union in any higher educational establishment in the UK. Crowley was founder of National Network of Deaf Students in 1987 and was one of organisers of the first-ever European Deaf Students Conference at Reading University, in July 1988. Crowley represented and gained in Club and international honours at Football and was a Deaflympic silver medallist for GB Deaf Football Team at 1985 Los Angeles Deaflympics (formerly World Games for the Deaf). He also obtained teaching & coaching qualifications in Tennis, Cricket, Football and Mountaineering. He briefly coached England Deaf Football during the late 1990s.

Involvement in Deaflympics
Following the Rome 2001 Deaflympics, a number of Deaf organisations and National Deaf Sport Specific Organisations appointed Crowley as Chair of Deaf Sports Strategy Group in 2002. A year later, he and others decided to co-found UK Deaf Sport and was elected as first chair.  Under his leadership between 2003 and 2009, UK Deaf Sport (UKDS) duly achieved in ICSD & EDSO memberships. He also oversaw two successful GB Deaflympic Teams in 2005 and 2009.

Crowley is the first British citizen and Deaflympian to have been elected as President of the International Committee of Sport for the Deaf (ICSD) at the summer ICSD Congress, Taipei in 2009. Crowley staged the Sofia Deaflympic Games in July 2013. Crowley was replaced as president by Dr Valery Rekhledev of Russia in 2013, despite securing legacy and agreement for Winter Deaflympics 2015 and Summer Deaflympics 2017. Through his leadership ICSD was formally commended by International Olympic Committee in September 2013.

Crowley also participated in the key MoU (Memorandum of Understanding) agreement between World Federation of the Deaf (WFD) and ICSD which was formally signed in July 2013. Crowley has since focused on Efficere Sports International and is also advocating for Deaflympics to work alongside Paralympics as part of long term international strategy for Deaf athletes globally.

Other Work
Crowley served his time as Chair of UK Council on Deafness advocating members' issues concerned with deafness and hearing loss at All Party Parliamentary Group level from 2016 until 2020. He is Trustee of Royal School for the Deaf Derby and is also the Honorary President of UK Deaf Sport

Awards/Achievements
Crowley was appointed a Member of the Order of the British Empire (MBE) in the 2006 Birthday Honours for his services to Sport. He has been elected a Fellow of The Royal Society for the encouragement of Arts, Manufactures & Commerce (FRSA) in November 2016.

Crowley was given the Signature Lifetime Achievement Award in November 2018 for his dedication to lifetime career in raising the profile and visibility of Deaf issues and Sign Language.

Crowley was also featured in BSL Zone's "Life Stories" programme where he chronicled his journey from growing up in the North East to achieving the prestigious leadership role at Deaflympics
https://www.bslzone.co.uk/watch/life-stories-craig-crowley/

References

1964 births
Living people
Deaf activists
English deaf people
Members of the Order of the British Empire